The Monza GP2 round was a GP2 Series race that ran from on the Autodromo Nazionale Monza track in Monza, Italy.

Winners

References

GP2 Series rounds
2005 establishments in Italy
2016 disestablishments in Italy